Justin Sadler (born October 29, 1982 in Harrisburg, Pennsylvania), is a U.S. soccer midfielder who last played for USL Second Division side Harrisburg City Islanders.

Youth
Sadler attended Cumberland Valley High School where he was a high school All American soccer player in 2000.  He then entered Drexel University where he was the team's freshman of the year in 2001.  At some point, he transferred to the University of Akron where he finished his collegiate soccer career.

Professional
In 2003 and 2004, Sadler played for the amateur South Jersey Barons. On March 8, 2006, the St. Louis Steamers of the Major Indoor Soccer League selected Sadler in the third round of the MISL College Draft.  However, the team folded before the 2006–2007 season and the Detroit Ignition picked up Sadler in the Dispersal Draft.  That summer, he spent the season with the Harrisburg City Islanders of the USL Second Division and does not appear to have played for the Ignition at any time.

References

1982 births
Living people
American soccer players
Drexel Dragons men's soccer players
Akron Zips men's soccer players
Ocean City Nor'easters players
USL Second Division players
Penn FC players
USL League Two players
Association football midfielders